Robert Sandager (December 24, 1914 – March 25, 2010) was an American sports shooter. He competed in the 300 m rifle, three positions event at the 1952 Summer Olympics.

References

1914 births
2010 deaths
American male sport shooters
Olympic shooters of the United States
Shooters at the 1952 Summer Olympics
People from Lisbon, North Dakota
Sportspeople from North Dakota
Pan American Games medalists in shooting
Pan American Games gold medalists for the United States
Shooters at the 1955 Pan American Games